is a former Nippon Professional Baseball player and manager. During his playing career he was well known as a skillful second baseman.

Career statistics
Bolded figures are League-leading

Titles and awards
Batting Champion: Once (1993)
On-Base Percentage Champion: Once (1993)
Mitsui Golden Glove Award: 8 times (1996, 1998–1994)
Best Nine Award: 5 times (1986, 1989, 1991–1993)
NPB All-Star appearances: 9 times (1986, 1988–1994, 1996)

References

External links

1958 births
Living people
Baseball people from Saga Prefecture
Japanese baseball players
Nippon Professional Baseball infielders
Seibu Lions players
Yakult Swallows players
Managers of baseball teams in Japan
Seibu Lions managers